St Swithun's Church, Martyr Worthy is a Church of England parish church in Martyr Worthy, Hampshire, England.

The church, parts of which date from the 12th century, is a Grade II* listed building. The broach spire at The Barn Church in Kew, London is modelled on that of St Swithun's.

References

External links
Churchyard graves

Church of England church buildings in Hampshire
Grade II* listed churches in Hampshire